Greekster's Garage is a car customizer and maker of custom cars in Santa Barbara, California. It was founded in 2005 by George Pappas.

http://www.greekstersgarage.com/

History
Greekster's Garage began as an automotive company specializing in classic automobile restoration and custom hot rod building. In recent years Greekster has created custom vehicles for business corporations such as Spire Federal Credit Union.

In July 2016 it was announced that Edit Light will be producing the first season of Greekster's Garage in a ten episode educational reality show that will cover all aspects of auto building.

Cast and crew 
The following includes those that will appear on the TV show ''Greekster's Garage.

George Pappas: "The Greekster"
Larry Wood: "The Mayor"

References

External links 
 Greekster's Garage Webstite

Vehicle modification media
Motor vehicle manufacturers based in California
American companies established in 2005
Vehicle manufacturing companies established in 2005
2005 establishments in California